The 1981 Volvo International was a men's tennis tournament played on outdoor clay courts in North Conway, New Hampshire in the United States and was part of the 1981 Volvo Grand Prix. The tournament ran from July 28 through August 3, 1981. José Luis Clerc won the singles title.

Finals

Singles

 José Luis Clerc defeated  Guillermo Vilas 6–3, 6–2
 It was Clerc's 5th title of the year and the 15th of his career.

Doubles

 Heinz Günthardt /  Peter McNamara defeated  Pavel Složil /  Ferdi Taygan 6–7, 7–5, 6–4
 It was Günthardt's 6th title of the year and the 10th of his career. It was McNamara's 4th title of the year and the 15th of his career.

References

External links
 ITF tournament edition details

 
Volvo International
Volvo International
Volvo International
Volvo International
Volvo International